The  is a river which runs through Kagoshima Prefecture and Miyazaki Prefecture in Japan and ultimately drains into the Pacific Ocean.

River communities 

The river passes through or forms the boundary of the following communities: 
Kagoshima Prefecture
Soo
Miyazaki Prefecture
Miyakonojō, Kobayashi, Miyazaki

References 

Rivers of Kagoshima Prefecture
Rivers of Miyazaki Prefecture
Rivers of Japan